Kampung Malaysia Raya is a small village in Kuala Lumpur, Malaysia. Located between Kuchai Lama, Desa Petaling and Sri Petaling, it is connected to the neighbouring townships and the capital city centre via the Sungai Besi Expressway. The village consists of Kampung Malaysia Tambahan and Kampung Malaysia Raya.

Villages in Kuala Lumpur